A 4.7 inch Gun is any of a number of British-built 120 mm naval artillery guns. Several of these guns were designed and manufactured by the Elswick Ordnance Company, part of Armstrong Whitworth. They were a major export item and hence were actually of 120 mm calibre (4.724 inches) to meet the requirements of metricised navies (although the size was ultimately based on a 12-pound round shot), 4.7 inch is an approximation used for the British designation. 4.7 inch guns include:

QF 4.7 inch Gun Mk I - IV British naval gun deployed on cruisers 1888 to 1918, also as a field gun in World War I
QF 4.7 inch Mk V naval gun Japanese-built gun, armed British merchant ships in World War I & World War II
BL 4.7 inch /45 naval gun British naval gun used 1918 to 1945
QF 4.7 inch Mk VIII naval gun British anti-aircraft gun on Nelson class battleships in World War II
4.7 inch QF Mark IX & XII British naval guns deployed on destroyers in World War II
QF 4.7 inch Mark XI gun British naval gun deployed on destroyers in World War II

See also
4.7 inch Gun M1906 United States field gun of 1906
4.7"/50 Mark 3 (Armstrong) United States naval gun built by Armstrong
120 mm artillery